Dar Balut-e Olya (also Romanized as Dār Balūţ-e ‘Olyā; also known as Dār Balūţ-e Bālā) is a village in Beyranvand-e Shomali Rural District, Bayravand District, Khorramabad County, Lorestan Province, Iran. At the 2006 census, its population was 421, in 95 families.

References 

Towns and villages in Khorramabad County